Willie Dean "Deanie" Frazier (October 30, 1950 in Savannah, Georgia – June 15, 2006) was the first African American woman sworn in under Judge Eugene Gadgsen as county commissioner in Savannah, and held the office of 5th district county commissioner for 14 years.  She and Savannah civil-rights leader W.W. Law founded the Black Heritage Festival. Frazier pleaded guilty in 1995 to two misdemeanor crack-cocaine possession charges and resigned her office in a plea deal.

Deanie Frazier testified in support of Supreme Court Justice Clarence Thomas during the afternoon session of hearing day six, September 17, 1991. Joe Biden, Chairman of the United States Senate Committee on the Judiciary, congratulated and praised Ms. Frazier for being the only witness thus far to deliver their testimony within the allotted five minutes.

Honors
Tatumvile community activist Mariam Pelote, community activist pastor Leonard Smalls and Frazier's daughter-in-law Jeanine Brooks Frazier were instrumental in the restoration of her name to the Staley Avenue's bridge, now named Deanie Frazier's overpass.  On August 9, 2007, Savannah city council honored Frazier by restoring her name to the Tatumville's community overpass by naming the bridge the "Deanie Frazier Overpass".

References

1950 births
2006 deaths
African-American people in Georgia (U.S. state) politics
African-American women in politics
County commissioners in Georgia (U.S. state)
Women in Georgia (U.S. state) politics
Politicians from Savannah, Georgia
Georgia (U.S. state) politicians convicted of crimes
20th-century American politicians
20th-century American women politicians
20th-century African-American women
20th-century African-American politicians
21st-century African-American people
21st-century African-American women